The 9th Lumières Awards ceremony, presented by the Académie des Lumières, was held on 17 February 2004. The ceremony was hosted by Patrick Souquet and presided by Patrice Chéreau. The Triplets of Belleville won the award for Best Film.

Winners

See also
 29th César Awards

References

External links
 
 
 9th Lumières Awards at AlloCiné

Lumières Awards
Lumières
Lumières
Lumières Awards
Lumières Awards